Football at the U-League is an event of the U-League and a university football competition in South Korea. South Korean university football clubs were originally participating in the Korean National University Football League, founded by the Korea University Football Confederation in 1965, but the Korea Football Association created its new league competition for university clubs in 2008. It operates outside the regular South Korean football league system.

Champions

List of champions

Titles by university

Current clubs 
List of participating universities in the 2022 U-League 1 (first division) and the 2022 U-League 2 (second division).

See also
 R League
 U-League

References

External links
 U-League at KFA 
 Korea University Football Confederation 

 
Football leagues in South Korea
Sports leagues established in 2008
2008 establishments in South Korea
University and college soccer in South Korea